Freedom is the third Christian worship music album by Darrell Evans, released by Vertical Music in 1998. This album also features Lincoln Brewster who played lead guitar and aided in songwriting. "So Good to Me" is on the Digital Praise PC game Guitar Praise.

Track listing 
"Trading My Sorrows (Yes Lord)" (Darrell Evans) - 6:00
"So Good to Me" (Evans and Matt Jones) - 3:38
"Freedom" (Evans) - 5:44
"I Am in Love with You" (Evans) - 9:33
"I Know" (Lincoln Brewster and Evans) - 4:37
"You Bless Me" (Evans and Ben Ferrell) - 5:29
"When I Pray" (Evans) - 4:46
"You Are My Portion" (Evans) - 6:19
"Your Love is Extravagant" (Evans) - 8:06
"I Lay Me Down" (Evans) - 7:00

Personnel 

Musicians
 Darrell Evans – lead vocals, acoustic guitar
 Blair Masters – keyboards (1-4, 6-10)
 Paul Mills – keyboards (5)
 Lincoln Brewster – electric guitars, mandolin, acoustic guitar (5), lead vocals (5)
 Matt Jones – bass
 Trent Austin – drums 
 Lisa Bevill – backing vocals 
 Rikk Kittleman – backing vocals 
 Gene Miller – backing vocals 
 Integrity Staff – group shout (3)

Production
 Paul Mills – producer, arrangements, engineer, mixing 
 Don Moen – executive producer 
 Chris Thomason – executive producer
 Chris Springer – A&R 
 Jeff Pitzer – assistant engineer 
 Adrienne Sallee – assistant engineer
 Brad Talbot – art direction, design 
 Rusty Rust – photography

1998 albums
Darrell Evans (musician) albums